Banshee is an American crime drama television series created by Jonathan Tropper and David Schickler for Cinemax. The series takes place in the fictional small town of Banshee, Pennsylvania. After serving 15 years in prison for stealing diamonds from Ukrainian gangster Rabbit (Ben Cross), the unnamed protagonist (Antony Starr) travels to Banshee to find his heist accomplice and former lover, Anastasia (Ivana Miličević). When he finds her, the protagonist learns that she is nowq a married mother of two living under the assumed identity of Carrie Hopewell. Later, when the incoming Sheriff is killed, the protagonist takes on his identity as Lucas Hood, becoming the town's new Sheriff, using his own brand of unorthodox methods. Banshee sees Hood struggle with adapting to his new identity while dealing with the machinations of local crime lord Kai Proctor (Ulrich Thomsen), and remaining hidden from Rabbit. The series premiered on January 11, 2013.

Series overview

Episodes

Season 1 (2013)

Season 2 (2014)

Season 3 (2015)

Season 4 (2016) 
In February 2015, Banshee was renewed for a fourth and final season of 8 episodes. This was two fewer than the 10 episodes in each of the first three seasons. Originally scheduled to premiere on January 29, 2016, the start of the season was delayed to April 1, 2016.

Banshee Origins webisodes

Season 1 (2013)

Season 2 (2014)

Season 3 (2014)

Banshee Origins Saga (2015) 
A two-part feature film titled Banshee Origins Saga was released on March 15, 2015. It includes a selection of footage from the first 33 episodes of the webseries.

Season 4 (2016)

References

External links 
 
 

Lists of American crime drama television series episodes